Mr. Bhatti on Chutti (transl. Mr. Bhatti on Holiday) is a Hindi comedy film that was released on 18 May 2012. It stars Anupam Kher as Mr. Bhatti, Bhairavi Goswami as Katy and Shakti Kapoor as a tourist. The film was directed by Karan Razdan and is distributed under the banner of Tulips Film Ltd.

Cast
 Anupam Kher as Mr. Bhatti
 Emma Kearney as Alice
 Bhairavi Goswami as Katy
 Shakti Kapoor as A Tourist
 Aman Irees as Mr. Bose
 Pawan Shankar as Prem
 Abid Ali as Inspector Javed Khan
 Neha Pendse
 Amitabh Bachchan as himself

Soundtrack

References

External links
 

2012 films
2012 comedy films
2010s Hindi-language films
Cultural depictions of Amitabh Bachchan
Films scored by Channi Singh
Indian comedy films